The Sartorialist is a fashion blog by Scott Schuman in New York City.

Details
After leaving a fashion sales position to take care of his daughter in 2005, Scott Schuman began carrying a digital camera around on the streets of New York City, taking pictures of people who had dressed in a way that caught his eye, and then posting them to his blog, sometimes with comments about what he'd found. He pioneered fashion photography in blog form.

Schuman began The Sartorialist with the idea of creating a two-way dialogue about the world of fashion and its relationship to daily life.

He describes his philosophy as trying to echo how fashion designers looked at what they saw on the street:

Schuman collaborated with numerous advertising campaigns: for The Gap and Verizon, with Kiehl's on an exclusively commissioned product and campaign surrounding Father's Day, Nespresso, DKNY Jeans, Gant, OVS, Crate & Barrel. Burberry, meanwhile, tapped Schuman to shoot the groundbreaking social media-cum-advertising “Art of the Trench” project.

Schuman began getting other work from serious fashion publications. Condé Nast tapped him to do something similar during Paris Fashion Week for its style.com website. He also regularly works events for Saks Fifth Avenue, and says French Vogue editor Carine Roitfeld has also talked to him about doing something for her magazine.

In 2009, an anthology of Schuman's favourite shots from around the world was published as a book entitled The Sartorialist.

See also
Glamourina
Karla Deras

References

External links

Fashion websites
Street fashion
American photography websites